Nakhimov District is an administrative raion (district) of the city of Sevastopol, named after Russian admiral Pavel Stepanovich Nakhimov. Population:

References

 
Urban districts of Sevastopol